Graham Dale, born January 1978 in Dublin, Ireland, is a former US Marine, later a network engineer and writer.

Life
Dale was born in Raheny, Dublin, Ireland. He emigrated to the United States in 2000. He served with the US Marine Corp., including in Iraq.  As a result of his trauma in Iraq, Dale is registered as suffering with PTSD and receives disability benefit associated with his disorder.

As of 2019 he resides in Cedar Park, Texas where he works as a computer network engineer. He is also an active Volunteer Firefighter and EMT with the Jollyville fire department in Austin, Texas.

Publication
Dale is the author of The Green Marine: An Irishman's War in Iraq, in which he chronicles his enlistment into the US Marines and tour of duty in Iraq. Upon witnessing the horrors inflicted upon his newly adopted country during the 911 attacks in the United States, Dale signed up to the US Marines and served his country for six years, including one tour in Iraq. His book provides a first hand account of his unique status of an Irishman in the US Marines from his days in training through to combat in Iraq.

See also

References

1978 births
Military personnel from Dublin (city)
People from Raheny
Irish emigrants to the United States
United States Marines
Irish male writers
People from Cedar Park, Texas
Living people